George Chase may refer to:

 George W. Chase (died 1867), U.S. Representative from New York
 George H. Chase (1843–1918), U.S. politician from Arizona
 George C. Chase (1844–1919), American academic
 George Henry Chase (1874–1952), American archeologist
 George Chase (bishop) (1886–1971), Master of Selwyn College, Cambridge
 George S. Chase (1909–1972), American composer for film and library music
 George Francis Chase (1848–1925), U.S. Army officer